HK Martin is a professional ice hockey team playing in the second highest league (Slovak 1. Liga) in Slovakia.

History
The club was established in 1932 as Slávia Martin. Later the name was changed to Sokol, ŠK, ZŤS, Hutník, Martimex ZŤS, Martimex and MHC Martin (2000–2010). The Slávia, Sokol, ŠK (Športový klub - Sport Club), TJ (Telovýchovná jednota - bodybuilding unity) names are common names meaning sport organisation in Slovakia or Czechoslovakia. The names Hutnik, ZŤS and Martimex are connected to heavy industry companies, a major employer in the region from the 1930s to the 1990s, which was a general sponsors. Since the 2010/2011 season the name of the club has been MHC Mountfield. From 1970 the club played in the county league in 1.SNHL. In the 1992/1993 season, the hockey club advanced into the Slovak Extraliga. MHC Martin played in the Slovak Extraliga every season thereafter except in 1999/2000 and 2004/2005, which were spent in the 1st-division Slovak National Hockey League.

After years of economic stability, which was rare for this provincial team, the management, head coach Dušan Gregor and his predecessor Ladislav Spišiak, systematically built up the team and won the bronze medal in the 2009/10 season. The team consisted of former youth players like Jaroslav Markovič jr., Andrej Themár, and Miroslav Dzubina, experienced players Ivan Ďatelinka, David Appel, Michal Macho, and Jaroslav Jabrocký, and veterans Michal Beran, Peter Klepáč, Marek Uram and Karol Križan. The team clinched the play-off spot by finishing in 4th place in the regular season (74 points in 47 matches). In the first round, MHC Martin got by HK36 Skalica with legendary Žigmund Pálffy on its roster, beating them 4 games to 3. In the second leg, MHC Martin lost to future champions HC Košice 4 games to 1.

The women's team, MHK Martin have won the women's Extraliga 10 times between 1997–2009. The junior organizations have also made some achievements, sending a number of players (and for years also doctor MUDr. Dalimír Jančovič, who cooperated with MHC Martin) into Slovak national men's, women's and junior competition.

Honours

Domestic

Slovak Extraliga
  3rd place (2): 1993–94, 2009–10

Slovak 1. Liga
  Winners (1): 1999–2000
  Runners-up (2): 2018–19, 2021–22
  3rd place (2): 2004–05, 2020–21

Slovak 2. Liga
  Runners-up (1): 2017–18

1st. Slovak National Hockey League
  Runners-up (3): 1983–84, 1985–86, 1991–92
  3rd place (3): 1984–85, 1986–87, 1992–93

International
IIHF Continental Cup
  Winners (1): 2008–09

Historical names
 Slávia Martin (1932–1939)
 Sokol Turčiansky Svätý Martin (1945–?)
 ŠK Martin (?)
 Spartak Martin (+/– 1957/58 +/–)
 TJ Hutník Martin (?–1969)
 Hutník Martin (1969/70)
 TJ Strojárne Martin (1970/71–1977)
 ZŤS Martin (1978–1989)
 HC Hutník ZŤS TS (1990–1992/1993)
 Martimex ZŤS Martin
 Martimex Martin
 MHC Martin (2000–2010)
 MHC Mountfield (2010–2016)
 MHK Martin (2017–2018) 
HK Martin (2018–)

Notable players

 Oto Haščák
 Rastislav Špirko
 Michal Macho
 František Skladaný
 Ján Tabaček 
 Lukáš Kozák
 Richard Pánik
 Peter Bartoš
 Peter Smrek
 Zdeno Cíger
 Róbert Švehla
 Radovan Somík
 Peter Trokan

References

External links
Official club website 

Martin, MHC
Martin, MHC
Martin, Slovakia
Ice hockey clubs established in 1932
1932 establishments in Czechoslovakia